Bargfeld is a hamlet of about 190 inhabitants near Celle in Lower Saxony, Germany, documented since 1056, now belonging to the village municipality Eldingen.

It has become famous for the many novels and stories the great German author Arno Schmidt has situated there, having lived there from 1958 until his death (1979). The Arno Schmidt Stiftung has its site in Bargfeld.

See as well 
 Eberhard Schlotter
 Gotthelf Schlotter

External links 

  The hamlet Bargfeld, home of german author Arno Schmidt
 Photographs of Bargfeld

Villages in Lower Saxony